Jerusalem is a surname.

Those bearing it include:
 Ignacio de Jerusalem y Stella (c. 1707-1769), Italian-born Mexican composer
 Wilhelm Jerusalem (1854–1923), Czech-Austrian philosopher
 Siegfried Jerusalem (born 1940), German operatic tenor singer